The champions and runners-up of the Wimbledon Championships Gentlemen's Doubles tournament, first introduced to the championship in 1884. From 1915 to 1918, and from 1940 to 1945, no competition was held due to the two World Wars.

Finalists

Amateur Era

Open Era

See also

Wimbledon other competitions
List of Wimbledon gentlemen's singles champions
List of Wimbledon ladies' singles champions
List of Wimbledon ladies' doubles champions
List of Wimbledon mixed doubles champions

Grand Slam men's doubles
List of Australian Open men's doubles champions
List of French Open men's doubles champions
List of US Open men's doubles champions
List of Grand Slam men's doubles champions

References

External links
 Gentlemen's doubles champions and runners-up at the official Wimbledon Championships website

Wimbledon gentlemen's doubles champions
Gentlemen
Wimbledon